Ramón Nicanor Quiroga (born 26 August 1997) is an Argentine boxer. He competed in the men's flyweight event at the 2020 Summer Olympics. Quiroga also won a bronze medal at the 2019 Pan American Games.

References

External links
 

1997 births
Living people
Argentine male boxers
Olympic boxers of Argentina
Boxers at the 2020 Summer Olympics
Pan American Games bronze medalists for Argentina
Boxers at the 2019 Pan American Games
Pan American Games medalists in boxing
Medalists at the 2019 Pan American Games
Sportspeople from Salta Province